David Barry may refer to:

 David de Barry, 5th Viscount Buttevant (1550–1617), Irish peer
 David Barry, 1st Earl of Barrymore (1604–1642)
 David Barry (physician) (1780–1835), Irish physician and physiologist
 David Francis Barry (1854–1934), photographer of the American West
 David S. Barry (1859–1936), American journalist
 Dave Barry (Australian footballer) (1888–1913), VFL and WAFL footballer
 Dave Barry (actor) (1918–2001), American actor, comedian, and radio moderator
 David Barry (actor) (born 1943), Welsh actor from sitcom Please Sir!
 Dave Barry (born 1947), American columnist
 Dave Barry (Irish footballer) (born 1961), dual code Irish footballer
 Aechmea 'David Barry', a hybrid cultivar

See also
David Berry (disambiguation)
David Ogilvy Barrie (born 1953), British diplomat and arts administrator